Prasophyllum wilkinsoniorum is a species of orchid endemic to New South Wales. It has a single tubular, bright green leaf and up to forty five scented, dark greenish-brown to brownish-red flowers with a green to pinkish labellum. It grows in grassy places in a restricted area on the Southern Tablelands.

Description
The flowers are dark greenish-brown to brownish-red and scented. As with others in the genus, the flowers are inverted so that the labellum is above the column rather than below it. There is a fleshy green to brown callus in the centre of the labellum. Flowering occurs from December to January.

Taxonomy and naming
Prasophyllum wilkinsoniorum was first formally described in 2000 by David Jones from a specimen collected near Tantawangalo and the description was published in The Orchadian.

Distribution and habitat
This leek orchid grows between Cathcart and Tantawangalo, usually in grassy flat areas.

References

External links 
 
 

wilkinsoniorum
Orchids of New South Wales
Endemic orchids of Australia
Plants described in 2000